Nigeria competed at the 1996 Summer Olympics in Atlanta, United States.
The most surprising achievement was Nigeria's gold in football. The team overcame what are usually considered much stronger teams, such as Brazil and finally Argentina to earn the gold.

Medalists

Gold

 Chioma Ajunwa — Athletics, Women's Long Jump
 Abiodun Obafemi, Augustine Okocha, Celestine Babayaro, Daniel Amokachi, Emmanuel Amuneke, Emmanuel Babayaro, Garba Lawal, Joseph Dosu, Nwankwo Kanu, Kingsley Obiekwu, Mobi Obaraku, Uche Okechukwu, Sunday Oliseh, Taribo West, Teslim Fatusi, Tijani Babangida, Victor Ikpeba, and Wilson Oruma — Football, Men's Team Competition

Silver
 Falilat Ogunkoya, Bisi Afolabi, Fatima Yusuf and Charity Opara — Athletics, Women's 4x400 metres Relay

Bronze
 Falilat Ogunkoya — Athletics, Women's 400 metres
 Mary Onyali — Athletics, Women's 200 metres
 Duncan Dokiwari — Boxing, Men's Super Heavyweight

Results by event

Athletics

Men 

Track and road events

Field events

Women 

Track and road events

Field events

Badminton 

Men

Women

Mixed

Boxing

Football

Men's Tournament 

Group Stage – Group C

  

Quarterfinal

Semifinal

Gold medal match

Team roster

Celestine Babayaro
Taribo West
Nwankwo Kanu
Uche Okechukwu
Emmanuel Amunike
Tijani Babangida
Wilson Oruma
Teslim Fatusi
Jay-Jay Okocha
Victor Ikpeba
Abiodun Obafemi
Garba Lawal
Daniel Amokachi
Sunday Oliseh
Mobi Oparaku
Joseph Dosu

Judo 

Men

Table Tennis

Men's Singles Tournament 

Group Stage - Group M

Group Stage - Group P

Men's Doubles Tournament 

Group Stage - Group H

Women's Singles Tournament 

Group Stage - Group I

Group Stage - Group P

Men's Doubles Tournament 

Group Stage - Group H

Tennis 

Men

Weightlifting

Wrestling 

Greco-Roman

Freestyle

See also
 Nigeria at the 1994 Commonwealth Games
 Nigeria at the 1998 Commonwealth Games

References

Official Olympic Reports
International Olympic Committee results database
sports-reference

Nations at the 1996 Summer Olympics
1996
Olympic Games